Strong City may refer to places in the United States:

 Strong City, Kansas, a city
 Strong City, Oklahoma, a town
 Lord Our Righteousness Church, New Mexico, a religious community sometimes called Strong City, and the subject of the National Geographic documentary "Inside a Cult"

See also
 Strong, Arkansas, a city